Ken Weston (30 May 1947 – 13 April 2001) was an English sound engineer. He won an Academy Award for Best Sound and was nominated for another in the same category. He worked on more than 50 films between 1974 and 2001.

Selected filmography
Weston won an Academy Award for Best Sound and was nominated for another:

Won
 Gladiator (2000)

Nominated
 Evita (1996)

References

External links

1947 births
2001 deaths
English audio engineers
Best Sound Mixing Academy Award winners
People from Finsbury Park
BAFTA winners (people)